Bożniewice refers to the following places in Poland:

 Bożniewice, Lublin Voivodeship
 Bożniewice, West Pomeranian Voivodeship